Linhe Township is a township under the administration of Xian County, Hebei, China. , it has 19 villages under its administration.

References 

Township-level divisions of Hebei
Xian County